Alma Vivian Powell ( Johnson; born October 27, 1937) is an American audiologist and the widow of military and political figure Colin Powell, whom she married on August 25, 1962.

Biography
She graduated from Fisk University in Nashville, Tennessee, and went on to study speech pathology and audiology at Emerson College in Boston.

She is the mother of former chairman of the Federal Communications Commission, Michael Powell. She also has two daughters, Linda Powell, an actress, and Annemarie Powell. Her father and uncle were principals of two high schools in Birmingham; Condoleezza Rice's father worked in her uncle's school as a guidance counselor.

Alma Powell is the chair of America's Promise, the nation's largest partnership dedicated to improving the lives of children and youth. She has also authored two children's books, America's Promise and My Little Red Wagon. In 2011 she was named the NASBE's National Education Policy Leader of the Year along with her husband.

References

External links
The History Makers

1937 births
African-American people
Audiologists
Fisk University alumni
Living people
People from Birmingham, Alabama
Colin L. Powell family